Justice Adair may refer to:

Hugh R. Adair (1889–1971), chief justice of the Montana Supreme Court
James Adair (serjeant-at-law) (c. 1743–1798), chief justice of Chester